Michael Ogilvie Imlah (26 September 1956 – 12 January 2009), better known as Mick Imlah, was a Scottish poet and editor.

Background
Imlah was brought up in Milngavie near Glasgow, before moving to Beckenham, Kent, in 1966. He was educated at Magdalen College, Oxford, where he subsequently taught as a Junior Fellow. He helped revive the historic Oxford Poetry before editing Poetry Review from 1983–6, and then worked at the Times Literary Supplement from 1992. His collection The Lost Leader (2008) won the Forward Prize for Best Collection, and was shortlisted for the 2009 International Griffin Poetry Prize.

Imlah died in January 2009, aged 52, as a result of motor neurone disease. He was diagnosed with this disease in December 2007. An issue of Oxford Poetry was dedicated to his memory.  Alan Hollinghurst dedicated his 2011 novel The Stranger's Child to Imlah's memory; the final section of the novel has the epigraph 'No one remembers you at all' from Imlah's poem 'In Memoriam Alfred Lord Tennyson'. A selection of Imlah's poetry, edited by Mark Ford and with an introduction by Alan Hollinghurst, was published by Faber and Faber in 2010. A selection of his prose appeared in 2015.

Bibliography

As author
 The Zoologist’s Bath (Oxford: Sycamore Press, 1982), 15 pages, 
 Birthmarks, the first full book of his poetry (Chatto & Windus, 1988), 56 pages, 
 Penguin New Poets 3: Glyn Maxwell, Mick Imlah, Peter Reading (1994), 
 Diehard, booklet (Clutag Press, 2006) 
 The Lost Leader, the second full book of his poetry before his death (Faber and Faber, 2008),

As editor
 Dr. Wortle's School by Anthony Trollope (Imlah wrote the introduction and notes; Penguin Classics, 1999), 
 The New Penguin Book of Scottish Verse (with Robert Crawford), 2000), 
 A Century of Poems (with Alan Jenkins), Times Supplements Ltd, 2002), 136 pp, 
 The TLS On Shakespeare (The Times, 2003), 178 pp, 
 Alfred, Lord Tennyson: Poems Selected by Mick Imlah (Faber and Faber, 2004), 
 Edwin Muir Selected Poems (Faber and Faber, 2008),

Posthumous
 Mick Imlah: Selected Poems Edited by Mark Ford and introduced by Alan Hollinghurst (Faber and Faber, 2010), 
 Mick Imlah: Selected Prose Edited by André Naffis-Sahely and Robert Selby (Peter Lang, 2015),

References

External links
Imlah profile at the Poetry Archive 
"Mick Imlah: the lost talent" 27 November 2010. Guardian 
Griffin Poetry Prize biography, including video clip of reading of Imlah poem
"Mick Imlah 1956–2009": a collection of poems by Imlah, reviews of his books and his own essays from TLS, January 12, 2009
Mick Imlah Poem in Qualm
Late poet's Griffin nomination delights loved ones

Alumni of Magdalen College, Oxford
Fellows of Magdalen College, Oxford
Scottish magazine editors
Deaths from motor neuron disease
Neurological disease deaths in the United Kingdom
1956 births
2009 deaths
People from Milngavie
20th-century Scottish poets
Scottish male poets
20th-century British male writers